Barkat Sidhu (18 September 1946 – 17 August 2014) was a Sufi singer from Moga district, Punjab, India, and a fine exponent of the Patiala Gharana. Barkat was born at Kaniya village near Shahkot in Jalandhar district in 1946. In his early days,  He got his musical training from his maternal uncle Niranjan Das (father of Puran Shahkoti) He then became disciple of Pandit Kesar Chand Narang and learnt Indian classical music.

Discography

 Deedar Mahi Da
 Har Surat Vich Tu
 Rom Rom Vich Tu
 The best of Barkat Sidhu

Gabu Schalabi
 Alif Allah
 Dekho Ni Ki Kar Gaya Mahi
 Uth Gaye Gawandon Yaar- the year of the supernatural

Death
Barkat Sidhu died of cancer in a hospital in Ludhiana on 17 August 2014. Punjab Chief Minister Parkash Singh Badal had directed the authorities of the private hospital in Ludhiana, where Barkat was admitted, to provide him treatment at free of cost. He died in the presence of his friends and family.

References

Download Songs here - https://web.archive.org/web/20120807073356/http://folkpunjab.com/barkat-sidhu/

1946 births
2014 deaths
Performers of Sufi music
Punjabi-language singers
20th-century Indian singers
Singers from Punjab, India